Stictogryllacris quadripunctata  is a species of Orthoptera in the family of Gryllacrididae. The scientific name of the species was first published in 1888 by Brunner von Wattenwyl.

References 

 Eades, D.C.; D. Otte; M.M. Cigliano & H. Braun. Orthoptera Species File. Version 5.0/5.0. http://Orthoptera.SpeciesFile.org [Accessed April 15, 2013]

Gryllacrididae
Insects described in 1888